"Song for You" is a song by Japanese recording artist Misia. It was performed throughout The Tour of Misia 2005 The Singer Show and was subsequently released on a bonus CD single with the first pressing of the tour DVD. The song and its instrumental version were released as a digital single on August 1, 2005.

On August 22, 2007, a live version of the song performed at a Hoshizora no Live IV concert in Niigata was digitally distributed in Chaku-Uta format and a portion of the proceeds were donated to relief efforts for the 2007 Chūetsu offshore earthquake.

Track listing

References 

2005 songs
Misia songs
Songs written by Misia